Zakagori ( or ; , Ĉetojtyqæw) is a village in the historical region of Khevi, north-eastern Georgia. It is located on the left bank of the river Suatisi. Administratively, it is part of the Kazbegi Municipality in Mtskheta-Mtianeti. Distance to the municipality center Stepantsminda is 29.5 km.

Sources 
 Georgian Soviet Encyclopedia
 Google Earth

References

Kobi Community villages